Anoncia aciculata is a moth in the family Cosmopterigidae. It was described by Edward Meyrick in 1928. It is found in North America, where it has been recorded from Texas and Nevada.

References

Natural History Museum Lepidoptera generic names catalog

Moths described in 1928
Cosmopteriginae
Moths of North America